Max Bruch's Serenade in A minor, Op. 75 is a composition for violin and orchestra, which was composed in 1899.

Structure

The work has four movements, and takes approximately 35 to 40 minutes to perform:

 Andante con moto
 Allegro moderato, alla marcia
 Notturno
 Allegro energico e vivace

References
Notes

Sources

External links
 

Compositions by Max Bruch
Compositions for violin and orchestra
1899 compositions
Compositions in A minor
Serenades